Francis Joseph Magner (March 18, 1887 – June 13, 1947) was an American prelate of the Roman Catholic Church. He served as bishop of the Diocese of Marquette in Michigan from 1941 to 1947.

Biography

Early life 
Francis Magner was born on March 18, 1887, in Wilmington, Illinois, to James and Margaret (née Follen) Magner. He was the third of eight children; one sister, Elizabeth Manger, joined the Sisters of Mercy and one brother, James Manger, also became a priest. James Magner the elder worked as a farmer and merchant, also serving as a city commissioner and alderman.

After graduating from St. Ignatius College in Chicago, Francis Magner attended St. Mary's College in St. Marys, Kansas. He continued his studies in Rome at the Pontifical North American College. Magner earned a Doctor of Philosophy degree from the University of Propaganda in 1909, and a Bachelor of Canon Law degree from Apollinarus University in 1911.

Priesthood 
While in Rome, Magner was ordained to the priesthood by Archbishop James Edward Quigley for the Archdiocese of Chicago on May 17, 1913.  After his ordination, Magner held the following parish assignments in Illinois:

 Curate at St. Mary Nativity in Joliet 
 Curate at St. Pius V in Chicago
 Curate at St. Mel in Chicago
 Curate at St. Francis Xavier in Wilmette
 Pastor of St. James in Highwood (1924 to 1927)
 Pastor of St. Mary in Evanston (1927 to 1941) 

Magner was named a monsignor in 1939.

Bishop of Marquette 
On December 21, 1940, Magner was appointed the seventh bishop of the Diocese of Marquette by Pope Pius XII. He received his episcopal consecration on February 24, 1941, from Archbishop Samuel Stritch, with Bishops Eugene J. McGuinness and William O'Brien serving as co-consecrators, at Holy Name Cathedral in Chicago. His installation took place at St. Peter Cathedral in Marquette on March 20, 1941.

During his six-year tenure, Magner provided attention to the mission parishes of the diocese, established the diocesan newspaper, promoted U.S. Laymen's Retreat Association, and created seven catechetical schools.

Death and legacy 
Francis Manger died on June 13, 1947, after a long illness in Marquette, at age 60. He is buried in the crypt of St. Peter Cathedral.

References

People from Wilmington, Will County, Illinois
Roman Catholic bishops of Marquette
20th-century Roman Catholic bishops in the United States
1887 births
1947 deaths
People from Evanston, Illinois
People from Highwood, Illinois
Catholics from Illinois